The 1992–93 season was FC Dinamo București's 44th season in Divizia A. Dinamo finished second in the championship, four points behind rivals Steaua. Before the 29th day, Dinamo and Steaua had the same number of points, but Dinamo lost the next match, at home, against Selena Bacău, then won only six points in the final five games.

After the title won the year before, Dinamo entered the newly-formed UEFA Champions League and in the first round eliminated Kuusysi Lahti from Finland, but lost in the second round against Olympique de Marseille, the eventual winner of the competition.

Results

UEFA Champions League 

First round

Dinamo București won 2–1 on aggregate.

Second round

Marseille won 2–0 on aggregate.

Squad 

Goalkeepers: Florin Prunea (22/0), Florin Tene (9/0), Perlat Musta (3/0).

Defenders: Zoltan Kadar (34/10), Gheorghe Mihali (32/4), Tibor Selymes (30/4), Adrian Matei (25/0), Vasile Jercălău (17/0), Leontin Grozavu (12/0), Marian Pană (9/1), Tudorel Cristea (2/0).

Midfielders: Dorinel Munteanu (34/15), Costel Pană (26/3), Daniel Timofte (26/0), Marius Cheregi (25/1), Sebastian Moga (23/3), Gábor Gerstenmájer (16/12), Marius Priseceanu (14/5), Cristian Sava (1/0), Eugen Popiştaşu (1/0), Cezar Dinu (1/0).

Forwards: Ovidiu Hanganu (33/12), Sulejman Demollari (27/7), Nelson Mensah (9/3), Marian Savu (5/1).

Transfers 

Cezar Dinu, Leontin Grozavu, Ovidiu Hanganu and Eugen Popistașu were the new players brought by Dinamo. Anton Doboş, Iulian Mihăescu,     Cristinel Atomulesei, Gabriel Răduță, George Visalom, Gheorghe Pană, Daniel Scînteie left the club.

References 
 www.labtof.ro
 www.romaniansoccer.ro
 Dinamo Bucuresti in 1992-93

FC Dinamo București seasons
Dinamo Bucuresti